Cryptostylis, commonly known as tongue orchids, is a genus of flowering plants from the orchid family. Tongue orchids are terrestrial herbs with one to a few stalked leaves at the base of the flowering stem, or leafless. One to a few dull coloured flowers are borne on an erect flowering stem. The most conspicuous part of the flower is the labellum, compared to the much reduced sepals and petals. At least some species are pollinated by wasps when they attempt to mate with the flower. There are about twenty five species found in South Asia, Southeast Asia and the South Pacific.

Description
Orchids in the genus Cryptostylis are terrestrial, perennial herbs with a thick, branching underground rhizome with vertical shoots forming at nodes. The plant has thick, fleshy roots but lacks a tuber. There are one to a few erect leaves, each with a distinct petiole and often purple on the lower surface, although C. hunteriana is saprophytic and leafless. New leaves are produced each year after flowering but each leaf has a life of several years.

The inflorescence is a raceme with from one to a few non-resupinate flowers. The sepals and petals (apart from the labellum) are narrow, free from and similar to each other. The most conspicuous part of the flower is the labellum which is attached to the base of the column and closely surrounds it. The fruit is a thin-walled capsule containing a large number of light coloured seeds.

Taxonomy and naming
Cryptostylis was first formally described in 1810 by the prolific Scottish botanist, Robert Brown and the description was published in his book, Prodromus Florae Novae Hollandiae et Insulae Van Diemen. Brown described three species in the same publication (C. longifolia, C. ovata and C. erecta) but did not nominate a type species. (Cryptostylis longifolia is an illegitimate name and the species is now known as C. subulata.)

The name Cryptostylis is derived from the Ancient Greek words kryptos meaning "hidden" and stylos meaning "pillar" or "column", referring to the column of these orchids which is partly hidden by the labellum.

Molecular study of the DNA of tongue orchids shows the genus lies within the tribe Diurideae within the orchid family, having previously been considered part of the Cranichideae. The genera Cryptostylis and Coilochilus (endemic to New Caledonia) make up the subtribe Cryptostylidinae.

Distribution and habitat
The genus comprises around twenty five species of terrestrial orchid distributed from India, Sri Lanka, Thailand, Taiwan, the Philippines, and Malaysia through Indonesia to Australia and New Zealand, as well as Samoa, New Caledonia and Vanuatu. Five species are found in Australia, of which three are endemic. Tongue orchids occur from temperate to tropical regions and in well-drained to swampy sites. Cryptostylis arachnites has the widest distribution and grows in rainforest, often in mountainous areas.

Ecology
All Australian species are pollinated by the ichneumon wasp known as the orchid dupe wasp (Lissopimpla excelsa). The male wasp mistakes the flower parts for a female wasp and attempts to copulate with it. Although the different species can occur together, they appear to inhibit cross-fertilisation and no hybrids are found in nature. This discovery was made by Australian naturalist Edith Coleman in 1928, and the term coined was "pseudocopulation". The mimicking of flowers to resemble female wasp parts has since been recorded in other orchid genera but only in Cryptostylis has the insect been observed ejecting seminal fluid containing sperm cells. Coleman suggested that the males are more strongly attracted to the orchid flowers than to female wasps of the same species. The flowers of Cryptostylis orchids and female wasp body parts are very similar in colour when viewed under a hymenopteran visual system, despite looking different to human eyes. Although the colours that ichneumon wasps see are unknown, bees and wasps have similar perception with green, blue and ultraviolet wavelengths.

The Cryptostylis orchids are unusual in that several species are pollinated by the same wasp species; other orchids which mimic insects are often species-specific. The flowers have no smell detectable to humans, but have been shown to have an odour which attracts the orchid dupe wasp. Furthermore, gas chromatography and electrophysiology show that the single active compound for pollinator attraction is found in different species of Cryptostylis.

Species
Species currently accepted as of July 2018:

Cryptostylis acutata J.J.Sm. - Java, Borneo, Sumatra
Cryptostylis apiculata J.J.Sm. - New Guinea
Cryptostylis arachnites (Blume) Hassk. in C.L.Blume - Guangdong, Guangxi, Taiwan, Cambodia, Assam, Indonesia, Laos, Malaysia, Myanmar, New Guinea, Philippines, Sri Lanka, Thailand, Laos, Myanmar, Vietnam, Andaman Islands, Solomon Islands, Fiji, New Caledonia, Samoa, Vanuatu
Cryptostylis arfakensis J.J.Sm. - New Guinea
Cryptostylis carinata J.J.Sm. - New Guinea
Cryptostylis clemensii (Ames & C.Schweinf.) J.J.Sm. - Sabah
Cryptostylis concava Schltr. - New Guinea
Cryptostylis conspicua J.J.Sm. - Thailand, Malaysia, Java, Sumatra
Cryptostylis erecta R.Br. - Queensland, New South Wales, Victoria
Cryptostylis filiformis Blume - Java
Cryptostylis gracilis Schltr.  - New Guinea
Cryptostylis hamadryas Schltr. - New Guinea
Cryptostylis hunteriana Nicholls - Queensland, New South Wales, Victoria
Cryptostylis javanica J.J.Sm.  - Java
Cryptostylis lancilabris Schltr.  - New Guinea
Cryptostylis leptochila F.Muell. ex Benth. - Queensland, New South Wales, Victoria, Tasmania
Cryptostylis ligulata J.J.Sm.  - New Guinea
Cryptostylis maculata (J.J.Sm.) J.J.Sm. - New Guinea
Cryptostylis ovata R.Br. - Western Australia
Cryptostylis sigmoidea J.J.Sm.  - New Guinea
Cryptostylis sororia Schltr. - New Guinea
Cryptostylis subulata (Labill.) Rchb.f. - Queensland, New South Wales, Victoria, Tasmania, South Australia, New Zealand North Island
Cryptostylis taiwaniana Masam. - Taiwan, Philippine

See also 
 List of Orchidaceae genera

References

External links 
 

 
Diurideae genera
Taxa named by Robert Brown (botanist, born 1773)